Nieto Sobejano Arquitectos is an architecture firm, founded in 1984 by Fuensanta Nieto and Enrique Sobejano with offices in Madrid and, since 2007, in Berlin.

Partners 
Fuensanta Nieto (Madrid, Spain, 1957) has worked as an architect since graduating from the Universidad Politécnica de Madrid and the Graduate School of Architecture and Planning at Columbia University in New York in 1981. She is a founding partner of Nieto Sobejano Arquitectos and a professor at the Universidad Europea de Madrid. Fuensanta Nieto lectures on architecture and participates in juries and symposia at various institutions around the world. From 1986 to 1991 she was co-director of the architectural journal Arquitectura, published by the Colegio Oficial de Arquitectos de Madrid.

 (Madrid, Spain, 1957) has worked as an architect since graduating from the Universidad Politécnica de Madrid and the Graduate School of Architecture and Planning at Columbia University in New York in 1981. He is professor at the Universität der Künste Berlin (UdK), where he holds the chair of Principles of Design. He has been a visiting critic and lecturer at various international universities worldwide. From 1986 to 1991 he was co-director of the architectural journal Arquitectura, published by the Colegio Oficial de Arquitectos de Madrid. He chairs and participates in international conferences and juries and is a founding partner of Nieto Sobejano Arquitectos.

Studio 
As well as being widely published in international magazines and books, the firm's work was exhibited at the Biennale di Venezia in 2000, 2002, 2006 and 2012, at the Museum of Modern Art (MoMA) in  New York, in 2006, at the Kunsthaus in Graz in 2008 and at the MAST Foundation in Bologna in 2014. It is the recipient of the 2007 National Prize for Restoration from the Spanish Ministry of Culture and the 2010 Nike Prize issued by the Bund Deutscher Architekten (BDA), as well as the Aga Khan Award for Architecture (2010), the Piranesi Prix de Rome (2011), the European Museum of the Year Award (2012), the Hannes Meyer Prize (2012), AIA Honorary Fellowship (2015) and the Alvar Aalto Medal in 2015. Major works include two projects at Córdoba (the Madinat al-Zahra Museum and the Contemporary Art Centre), the Moritzburg Museum and extensions to the San Telmo Museum in San Sebastian, and the Joanneum in Graz. Nieto Sobejano Arquitectos currently has projects in Germany, Spain, Austria, Estonia and Morocco. Two monographs have been published about their work: "Nieto Sobejano. Memory and Invention" (Hatje Cantz Verlag, Ostfildern, Germany, 2013) and "Fuensanta Nieto, Enrique Sobejano. Architetture" (Mondadori Electa Spa, Milano, Italy, 2014).

Awards 
 Aga Khan Award for Architecture 2010
 Award for Excellence in Architecture of the State of Saxonia 2010, Germany
 Via Arquitectura’s Award for excellence in national and international architecture 2010, Spain
 :de:Nike (Architekturpreis) BDA 2010, Germany
 Piranesi Prix de Rome 2011, Italy
 WAN Awards 2011, 21 for 21, Great Britain 
 Hannes-Meyer Award 2012, Germany
 Award of the VIII BIENAL Iberoamericana de Arquitectura y Urbanismo 2012, Spain
 European Museum of the Year Award, Museum :es:Museo de Medina Azahara, 2012
 Alvar Aalto Medal 2015

Exhibitions 
 2006: On Site: New Architecture in Spain, MoMA, New York City, USA
 2008: Nieto Sobejano: arquitectura concreta, :de:Architekturforum Aedes, Berlin, Germany and Kunsthaus Graz, Graz, Austria
 2013: Nieto Sobejano: Memory and Invention, Architekturgalerie München e.V., Munich, Germany
 2014: Nieto Sobejano Arquitectos, MAST Foundation: Galleria dell’architettura, Bologna, Italy

Publications 
 Oscar Rueda: Sobejano Nieto: 1996–2001 Displacements. Rueda, Madrid 2002, 
 :de:Jürgen Tietz: Nieto Sobejano - Das neue Kunstmuseum in Halle: :de:Stiftung Moritzburg. Hirmer, München 2008, 
 Fuensanta Nieto, Enrique Sobejano (Hrsg.): Nieto Sobejano: Memory and Invention. Hatje Cantz, Ostfildern 2013, 
 Fuensanta Nieto, Enrique Sobejano (Hrsg.): Monograph N.S. 2014. Electa Architecttura, Mailand 2014,

References

External links 
 Official webpage of Nieto Sobejano Arquitectos
 

Architecture firms of Spain
Architecture firms of Germany
Architects from Madrid
Architecture in Spain
Architects from Berlin